Ingeborg Vassbakk Løyning (born 13 September 2000) is a Norwegian swimmer. She competed in the women's 100 metre backstroke at the 2019 World Aquatics Championships held in Gwangju, South Korea.

Coming from Narvik, she moved to Bærum at age 16 to attend the Norwegian School of Elite Sport.

References

External links
 
 
 
 
 

2000 births
Living people
People from Narvik
Norwegian female backstroke swimmers
Place of birth missing (living people)
Swimmers at the 2018 Summer Youth Olympics
Swimmers at the 2020 Summer Olympics
Olympic swimmers of Norway
Sportspeople from Nordland
21st-century Norwegian women